Pisary may refer to the following places in Poland:
Pisary, Lower Silesian Voivodeship (south-west Poland)
Pisary, Lesser Poland Voivodeship (south Poland)
Pisary, Świętokrzyskie Voivodeship (south-central Poland)